This list of tallest buildings in Washington, D.C. ranks high-rises in the U.S. capital of Washington, D.C. The tallest structure in the city, excluding radio towers, is the Washington Monument, which rises  and was completed in 1884. The structure, however, is not generally considered a high-rise building as it does not have successive floors that can be occupied. The tallest habitable building in the city is the Basilica of the National Shrine of the Immaculate Conception, which rises . As of November 2011, there are 410 completed high-rises in the city.

History

Washington's history of high-rises began with the completion in 1894 of The Cairo, an apartment building, which is considered to be the city's first high-rise. The building rises  and 14 floors. Washington went through an early high-rise construction boom from the late 1890s to the mid-1930s, during which time the Old Post Office Building and the Federal Triangle were built. The city then experienced a major building boom from the early 1940s to the late 1990s, during which the city saw the completion of 31 of its 48 tallest buildings, including One Franklin Square and 700 Eleventh Street. However, although the city is home to several high-rises, none are considered to be genuine "skyscrapers"; only two completed buildings surpass .

The height of buildings in Washington is limited by the Height of Buildings Act. The original Act was passed by Congress in 1899 in response to the 1894 construction of the Cairo Hotel, which is much taller than the majority of buildings in the city. However, building heights are measured from the sidewalk or curb to the edge of the roof. Architectural embellishments, mechanical rooms, and common rooftop structures may be exempted from the overall height limit, provided they are set back from the roof line. The heights of buildings listed here may therefore exceed the general height limit as measured for the purpose of the city's zoning laws.

In modern times the skyline remains low and sprawling, keeping with Thomas Jefferson's wishes to make Washington an "American Paris" with "low and convenient" buildings on "light and airy" streets. Washington's height restriction, however, has been assailed as one of the primary reasons why the city has inflated rents, limited affordable housing, and traffic problems as a result of urban sprawl. Much like La Defense near Paris, many of the region's tallest buildings near the central business district are located in Rosslyn, Virginia, directly across the Potomac River from Georgetown.

As of July 2008, there is one high-rise under construction in the city that is expected to rise at least , with one more proposed and one approved for construction. Onyx on First was the first high-rise built in Washington; upon completion, it was the 14th-tallest building in the city. Two other large developments taking place are Square 54 Residential I, which is proposed for construction, and the PNC Bank Building, which is approved. As of July 2008, there is a total of four high-rise buildings under construction, approved for construction and proposed for construction in Washington.

Tallest buildings

This lists ranks Washington high-rises that stand at least , based on standard height measurement. This includes spires and architectural details but does not include antenna masts. The "Year" column indicates the year in which a building was completed. Freestanding towers, while not habitable buildings, are included for comparison purposes; however, they are not ranked. The majority of the tallest structures in the city are tall broadcasting towers located in the northern and western sections of the district.

Tallest demolished
This lists buildings in Washington that have been demolished and at one time stood at least  in height.

Timeline of tallest buildings
This lists buildings that once held the title of tallest building in Washington, D.C. This list excludes the  Washington Monument, which has stood as the tallest non-building structure in the city since 1884.

Notes
A. Not a habitable building and is therefore not ranked, but it is included in this list for comparative purposes.

References
General
 
Specific

External links
 Diagram of Washington, D.C. high-rises on SkyscraperPage

District
Washington D.C.
Tallest
Washington, D.C.-related lists